Oswaldo Enrique López Arellano (30 June 1921 – 16 May 2010) was a Honduran politician who twice served as the President of Honduras, first from 1963 to 1971 and again from 1972 until 1975.

Early life
Lopez was born in Danlí to Enrique López and Carlota Arellano in the department of El Paraíso, an influential family. He joined the Army at eighteen and subsequently graduated as a pilot from the Honduran Air Force School (Academia Militar de Aviación de Honduras Capitán Raúl Roberto Barahona Lagos). He then spent 1942-1945 in the U.S. state of Arizona studying mechanical aviation. López served as a colonel for numerous years and eventually rose to the rank of general.

Career
López briefly fought for on a military junta during 1957, which ended after democratic elections were secured. After a violent coup, he served as president for the first time from 3 October 1963 until 7 June 1971 before allowing further elections (1971 Honduran general election) to take place in April 1971. They ultimately resulted in Ramón Ernesto Cruz coming to power. On 4 December 1972, López again seized power, in the 1972 Honduran coup d'état.

During his second tenure as president, López oversaw a major land reform bill that sought to defuse tensions among peasants over their forced removal from uncultivated lands owned by landed elites or by US fruit companies. This plan was called the National Development Plan and went through two stages, the first in 1965 and the most significant ones between 1972 and 1975. The Agrarian Reform Law of 1972, a Minimum Wage Act in 1973, and a Land Reform Act in 1975 came in response to the peasant union pressure, such as the CTH, Confederación de Trabajadores Hondureños and the ANACH Associación Nacional de Campesinos Hondureños. The most important unions clamoring for reform were the United Fruit and Standard Fruit unions SITRATERCO and SUSTRAFSCO. These unions also had support among industrial workers.

López led Honduran forces during the Football War.

Resignation
In 1975, the U.S. Securities and Exchange Commission exposed a scheme by United Brands Company to bribe  President López with US$1.25 million, with the promise of another $1.25 million upon the reduction of certain banana export taxes. Trading in United Brands stock was halted, and on 22 April 1975 López was ousted in a military coup led by his fellow General Juan Alberto Melgar, in the 1975 Honduran coup d'état. This scandal is known in Honduras as "Bananagate".

Personal life
López owned several businesses in Central America, including TAN-SAHSA, the now defunct Honduran air carrier. 

His eldest son, Oswaldo, died in 2003. 

Lopez died on 16 May 2010 at the age of 88 while undergoing surgery for prostate cancer.

References
 Pauly, David and Thomas, Rich (1975) "The Great Banana Bribe" Newsweek 21 April 1975, p. 76;
Obituary 
Acker, Alison. Honduras: The Making of a Banana Republic. 1988.
Morris, James. Honduras: Caudillo Politics and Military Rulers. 1984.

Notes

See also
Union of Banana Exporting Countries

1921 births
2010 deaths
People from El Paraíso Department
Deaths from cancer in Honduras
Deaths from prostate cancer
Leaders ousted by a coup
Leaders who took power by coup
Presidents of Honduras
Honduran expatriates in the United States